Trilobachne is a genus of South Asian plants in the grass family.

 Species
The only known species is Trilobachne cookei, native to Myanmar and to India (Gujarat, Karnataka, Maharashtra, Kerala).

References

Andropogoneae
Monotypic Poaceae genera
Flora of Asia